Isabel of Cambridge, Countess of Essex (1409 – 2 October 1484) was the only daughter of Richard, 3rd Earl of Cambridge, and Anne Mortimer. She was the sister of Richard Plantagenet, 3rd Duke of York, and like him a great-grandchild of Edward III of England.

Early life
Isabel of York, the only daughter of Richard of Conisburgh, 3rd Earl of Cambridge, and Anne Mortimer, was born about 1409.  Through her father, she was the granddaughter of King Edward III's fourth surviving son, Edmund of Langley, 1st Duke of York, and his first wife, Isabella of Castile.  Through her mother, Anne Mortimer, Isabel was the granddaughter of Roger Mortimer, 4th Earl of March, and Lady Alianore Holland (granddaughter of Lady Joan of Kent, Princess of Wales) and the great-great-granddaughter of King Edward III's second surviving son, Lionel of Antwerp.

Isabel's father, Richard, Earl of Cambridge, was beheaded on 5 August 1415 for his part in the Southampton Plot against King Henry V. Although the Earl's title was forfeited, he was not attainted, and Isabel's brother, Richard, then aged four, was his father's heir. Within a few months of his father's death, Richard's childless uncle, Edward of Norwich, 2nd Duke of York, was slain at the Battle of Agincourt on 25 October 1415, and Isabel's brother was eventually his uncle's heir as well.

Marriages and issue
In 1412, at three years of age, Isabel was betrothed to Sir Thomas Grey (1404 – d. before 1426), son and heir of Sir Thomas Grey (c.1385–1415) of Heaton in Norham, Northumberland, and his wife, Alice Neville, the daughter of Ralph Neville, 1st Earl of Westmorland. The marriage took place on 18 February 1413. They had one son, also called Thomas Grey (1423–1493). The elder Sir Thomas Grey was an associate of Isabel's father who also lost his life in the Southampton Plot.

She married secondly Henry Bourchier, 1st Earl of Essex, before 25 April 1426.  The marriage was later validated by papal dispensation.  By Essex, she had at least eleven children:

 William Bourchier, Viscount Bourchier (d. 1480), who married Anne Woodville, daughter of Richard Woodville, 1st Earl Rivers and Jacquetta of Luxembourg, parents of Henry Bourchier, 2nd Earl of Essex, and Cecily Bourchier, wife of John Devereux, 9th Baron Ferrers of Chartley;
 Sir Henry Bourchier (d. 1462), who married Elizabeth Scales, 8th Baroness Scales.
 Humphrey Bourchier, 1st Baron Cromwell (d. 14 April 1471), slain at the Battle of Barnet.
 John Bourchier, 6th Baron Ferrers of Groby (d.1495), who married firstly Elizabeth Ferrers, and secondly Elizabeth Chichelle.
 Edward Bourchier (d. 30 December 1460). Killed in the Battle of Wakefield.
 Sir Thomas Bourchier (b. prior to 1448 d. 1492), who  married Isabella Barre. No known children.
 Florence Bourchier (d. 1525).
 Fulk Bourchier. Considered to have died young.
 Hugh Bourchier. Considered to have died young.
 Isabella Bourchier. Considered to have died young.
 Laura Bourchier (b.1440), who married John Courtenay, 7th Earl of Devon, (killed at Tewkesbury, 1471).

Death
Henry Bourchier, 1st Earl of Essex, died on 4 April 1483. Isabel remained a widow and died on 2 October 1484. A manuscript calendar records her death on VI Non Oct in 1484. Both were buried at Beeleigh Abbey near Maldon, Essex, but later reburied at Little Easton, Essex.

Ancestry

Notes

References

Bibliography

 

1409 births
1484 deaths
Isabel, Countess of Essex
Isabel, Countess of Essex
15th-century English women
15th-century English people
English countesses
Wives of knights